Austro-Slavism or Austrian Slavism was a political concept and program aimed to solve problems of Slavic peoples in the Austrian Empire. It was most influential among Czech liberals around the middle of the 19th century. First proposed by Karel Havlíček Borovský in 1846, as an opposition to the concept of pan-Slavism, it was further developed into a complete political program by Czech politician František Palacký. Austroslavism also found some support in other Slavic nations in the Austrian Empire, especially the Poles, Slovenes, Croats and Slovaks.

Program
Austro-Slavism envisioned peaceful cooperation between the smaller Slavic nations of Central Europe within the Habsburg monarchy not dominated by German-speaking elites. Palacký proposed a federation of eight national regions, with significant self-governance. After the suppression of the Czech revolution in Prague in June 1848, the program became irrelevant. The Austrian Empire transformed into Austria-Hungary (1867), honouring Hungarian, but not Slavic demands as part of the Ausgleich. This further weakened the position of Austro-Slavism, as did the dawn of the coercive policy of Magyarization during the 1880s.

As a political concept, however, Austro-Slavism persisted until the fall of the Austrian-Hungarian Empire in 1918. Archduke Franz Ferdinand of Austria, who was heir presumptive to Emperor Franz Joseph, was a true believer in Austro-Slavism, which he felt was a necessary and long overdue reform if the Empire was to survive.

The Archduke's reform plans, which were almost certainly sold to the Governments of Russia and Serbia by Colonel Alfred Redl, are believed, accordingly, to have played a major role in causing senior Pan-Slavist officers within the military intelligence service of Serbia to covertly plan the Archduke's 1914 assassination in Sarajevo. Long before his death, however, the Archduke had passed his sympathies for Austro-Slavism and plans to return the Empire to Federalism down to his nephew, who went on to become the last Hapsburg monarch: Emperor Charles I of Austria.

The 1918 collapse of Austria-Hungary owed a great deal to Emperor Charles' failure to implement Austro-Slavist reforms due to both the opposition both foreign and domestic politicians and to the ongoing chaos of the First World War. Meanwhile, Tomáš Garrigue Masaryk, who was later to become the first President of Czechoslovakia, had successfully convinced U.S. President Woodrow Wilson during the First World War that the Slavic peoples of Austria-Hungary were oppressed and needed to be liberated. This, in turn, led directly to President Wilson's rejection of the efforts of Emperor Charles I of Austria to return the Empire to federalism (such as the abortive United States of Greater Austria plan). President Wilson's refusal to accept an end to the war on any other terms led directly to the collapse of the Empire in 1918.

Prominent supporters 
 Archduke Franz Ferdinand of Austria
 Charles I of Austria
 Josip Jelačić
 Janez Bleiweis
 Karel Havlíček Borovský 
 Jernej Kopitar
 Anton Tomaž Linhart
 Franz Miklosich
 František Palacký
 
 Josip Juraj Strossmayer

See also 
 Austromarxism and national personal autonomy
 Czechoslovakia–Yugoslavia relations
 Euro-Slavism
 Neo-Slavism
 Pan-Slavism
 Olomouc University in the year of revolutions
 Trialism in Austria-Hungary

References

External links
  Austroslavism at Encyclopedia of history of Ukraine

Pan-Slavism
Federalism in Austria-Hungary
Politics of Austria-Hungary
Political history of the Czech Republic
Habsburg Bohemia
Modern history of Slovenia
Slovakia under Habsburg rule
Croatia under Habsburg rule
Revolutions of 1848